Holy Cross Catholic Cemetery is a private cemetery located in Cape Collinson, on Hong Kong Island, Hong Kong. It is managed by The Catholic Diocese of Hong Kong. The cemetery was completed and opened in 1960.

Notable burials
 Rev. Stephen B. Edmonds (1911–2005), founder of Meng Tak Catholic School, Chai Wan Star of the Sea Catholic Primary School and Mary Help of Christians Primary School
 Richard Lam Chun-Keung (1948–2003), Cantopop lyricist
 Tsang Wan (1920–1997), police officer and father of former Chief Executive Donald Tsang and the father of former Commissioner of Police Tsang Yam-pui
 Thomas Koo (1987–2012), victim of the 2012 Lamma Island ferry collision
 Chan Man Ying, victim of the 2012 Lamma Island ferry collision
 Yuen Wai-Hung (1955–1998), actor, son of Lily Leung

See also
 List of cemeteries in Hong Kong

References

External links
 

Cemeteries in Hong Kong
Chai Wan
Roman Catholic Diocese of Hong Kong